The use of flags from the Nazi Germany (1933–1945) is currently subject to legal restrictions in a number of countries.

While legal in the majority of countries, the display of flags associated with the Nazi government (see: Nazi flags) is subject to restriction or an outright ban in several European countries.

Many Nazi flags make use of the swastika symbol; however, the swastika is not always used in connection with the National Socialist German Workers' Party movement or of the German Third Reich or the combined German military of 1933–1945. Outside of Nazism, use of swastikas pre-dates the German Third Reich by some 3,000 years. It is possible to display certain non-Nazi swastikas even in areas where Nazi swastikas are prohibited.

Summary table

Asia

Iran
After the 1979 Iranian Revolution, Holocaust denial, which is questioned by Ali Khamenei and Nazi symbols are legal in Iran though it dates to the 1940s during the Pahlavi era.

Israel
The use of Nazi symbols has been illegal in Israel since early 2012.

China
Until 2018, displaying Nazi symbol was treated as a kind of minor offence when it amounted to harassment, so those displaying Nazi symbol were usually punished by a small fine or less than 20 days detention under the Public Security Administration Punishment Law.

In April 2018, the 2nd Session of the Standing Committee of the 13th National People's Congress adopted a law called "" on April 27, 2018, which came into force on May 1 the same year. Those who display Nazi symbol or other fascist symbol will face heavy fines as well as imprisonment.

South Korea
The Republic of Korea has no provisions or laws regarding the use of Nazi imagery.

Thailand

The use of Nazi symbols are legal in Thailand.

North America

Canada 
Canada has no legislation specifically restricting the ownership, display, purchase, import or export of Nazi flags. However, sections 318–320 of the Criminal Code, adopted by Canada's parliament in 1970 and based in large part on the 1965 Cohen Committee recommendations, make it an offence to advocate or promote genocide, to communicate a statement in public inciting hatred against an identifiable group where it is likely to cause a breach of the public peace, or to communicate a statement which wilfully promotes hatred (other than in private conversation) against an identifiable group; and provides a framework for the judicially-authorized seizure, forfeiture and disposal of hate propaganda.

United States
Though controversial, public display of Nazi flags is protected by the First Amendment to the United States Constitution which, affirmed by the Supreme Court case Texas v. Johnson, guarantees the right to freedom of speech.

South America

Brazil
Laws No. 7,716/89 and No. 9,459/97 establish imprisonment and a fine for anyone who produces, markets, distributes or disseminates symbols, emblems, ornaments, badges or propaganda that use the swastika to advocate Nazism.

While holocaust denial is not explicitly prohibited in Brazilian law, precedents tend to lead to conviction. As of 11 February 2022, several bills criminalizing the act are pending in Congress.

Europe

Austria 
Austria strictly prohibits the public display and/or proliferation of all insignia/symbols, emblems, uniforms (full or partial), flags, etc., clearly associated with the National Socialist German Workers' Party (NSDAP, commonly known as the Nazi Party). There are legal exceptions for works of art (including books, films, theatre performances, computer games, and educational/memorial public exhibitions, etc.), these however do not apply if the respective work promotes National Socialism (as this is generally prohibited in Austria). The law has been amended to include commonly recognised replacements or slightly modified depictions of Nazi symbols.
Violations of the Badges Act 1960 (Abzeichengesetz 1960), which prohibits the public display of Nazi symbols, are punishable by up to €4000.- fine and up to 1 month imprisonment. However, if the violation is deemed an attempt to promote National Socialism, the Prohibition Act 1947 (Verbotsgesetz 1947) is applied, which allows for up to 10 years imprisonment.

Trading medals, uniforms or other memorabilia however is not illegal in Austria.

Belarus  
Article 3411 of the Criminal Code prohibits the public display, production, distribution, or storage  for the purpose of distribution, of Nazi symbolism or paraphernalia. The offence for this is listed as being punishable by a fine, arrest, or restraint of liberty for a term up to three years, or imprisonment for a term up to four years. Article 1301 of the Criminal Code prohibits the rehabilitation of Nazism. The offence for this is listed as being punishable by a fine, arrest, or restraint of liberty for a term up to five years, or imprisonment for the same term.

Czech Republic

Czech Republic has no legislation restricting ownership, display, purchase, import or export of Nazi flags; indeed Czech legislation makes even the banning of protests involving such flags very difficult.

In 1991, in Czechoslovakia the criminal code was amended with 260 which banned propaganda of movements which restricted human rights and freedoms, citing Nazism and Communism. Later the specific mentions of these were removed citing their lack of clear legal definition. However, the law itself was recognised as constitutional.

The police may cancel such events only once it becomes clear that protesters are inciting hate, which is deemed illegal in the Czech Republic. Legal regulation of hate crimes in the Czech Republic is contained in Act 140/1961 The Criminal Act (amended by Act 175/1990).

Cyprus
Cyprus has no legislation designed to restrict the ownership, display, purchase, import or export of Nazi flags, nor does the Criminal Code of Cyprus expressly allow for racist or other bias motives to be taken into account when sentencing.

However, use of Nazi flags in a manner likely to cause discrimination, hatred, or violence may be dealt with under Cyprus' ratification of the UN Convention on the Elimination of All Forms of Racial Discrimination. This allows for the prosecution of anyone who expresses an idea (in public, using almost any medium including flags) which insults another person's race, religion or ethnicity.

Estonia
In early 2007 the Riigikogu was proceeding a draft bill amending the Penal Code to make the public use of Soviet and Nazi symbols punishable if used in a manner disturbing the public peace or inciting hatred. The bill did not come into effect as it passed only the first reading in the Riigikogu.

Finland
Finland has no specific legislation aimed at controlling ownership, display, purchase, import or export of Nazi flags, however the Criminal Code (39/1889) (especially Chapter 11 'War crimes and offences against humanity' Section 8) may be applied where an offence has been directed at a person belonging to a national, racial, ethnic or other population group due to his/her membership in such a group.

Finland also has a history of swastikas for government and military flags. Flags containing the symbol can be found in the Finnish Air Force, Defence Forces, certain regiments of the army and flight schools.

France
In France, it is illegal to display Nazi flags, uniforms and insignia in public, unless for the purpose of a historical film, show, filmmaking or spectacle.

In April 2000, the International League against Racism and Anti-Semitism and Union des étudiants juifs de France (the Union of French Jewish Students) brought a case against Yahoo! which objected to the auctioning of Nazi memorabilia, in France, via Yahoo!'s website on the basis that it contravened Article R645-1. A French judge did initially order Yahoo! to take measures to make it impossible for users in France to reach any Nazi memorabilia through the Yahoo! site.

Germany
 
After World War Two, the penal code of the Federal Republic of Germany was amended to prohibit propaganda material and symbols of forbidden parties and other organisations (StGB 86 and 86a). This explicitly includes material in the tradition of a former national socialist organization. The production and distribution of such material is prohibited, as is the public display of the related symbols. Legal consequences can be a fine or a prison term of up to three years.

Examples are Nazi symbols, such as the swastika and the SS logo. It is legal to use the symbols for educational and artistic purposes.

Hungary

Section 335 of the Act C of 2012 on the Criminal Code of Hungary regulates the "use of symbols of totalitarianism", including the swastika, the insignia of the SS, the Nyilaskeresztes, the hammer and sickle, and the five-pointed red star.

Latvia
In June 2013, the Latvian parliament approved a ban on the display of Nazi symbols at all public events. The ban involves flags, anthems, uniforms, and the Nazi swastika.

Lithuania
Lithuania banned Nazi symbols in 2008 (Article 18818 of the Code of Administrative Offences) under the threat of a fine.  Article 5 of the Law on Meetings prohibits meetings involving Nazist and Soviet imagery.

Poland
In 2009, § 2 to 4 were added to Article 256 of the Polish Penal Code banning the "production, recording, importing, acquiring, storing, possessing, presenting or transporting" for the purpose of dissemination of "prints, recordings or other objects" that "publicly promote a fascist or other totalitarian system of state", unless done "as part of artistic, educational, collecting or academic activity", and provides for forfeiture regardless of owner upon conviction.

Russia
Russian administrative code prohibits propaganda, production and dissemination of Nazi symbols and lookalikes with fines up to 100,000 rubles.

Serbia
In 2009, Serbia passed a law prohibiting "manifestations of Neo-nazi or Fascist organizations and associations, and use of the Neo-nazi or Fascist symbols and insignia".

See also
 Nazi chic
 Bans on communist symbols
 Denazification
 Censorship
 Thoughtcrime

References

Notes

External links 
  
 

Flags of Nazi Germany
Symbols of Nazi Germany
Flag controversies
Iconoclasm
Aftermath of World War II
Censorship in Germany